Toledo, Ohio, held an election for mayor on November 5, 2013. The election was officially nonpartisan, with the top two candidates from the September 10 primary election advancing to the general election, regardless of party. Incumbent independent mayor Michael Bell lost reelection to independent city councilor D. Michael Collins.

Primary election

Candidates

Declared
 Michael Bell, incumbent mayor of Toledo
 D. Michael Collins, city councilor
 Opal Covey, perennial candidate
 Alan Cox, president of AFSCME Local 2058
 Donald Gozdowski
 Michael Konwinski, former city employee
 Anita Lopez, Lucas County Auditor
 Joe McNamara, city councilor and former president of Toledo City Council

Declined
 Michael Ashford, state representative (ran for reelection)
 Carty Finkbeiner, former mayor of Toledo
 Wade Kapszukiewicz, Lucas County Treasurer (ran for reelection)

Results

General election

Candidates
 Michael Bell, incumbent mayor of Toledo
 D. Michael Collins, city councilor

Endorsements

Results

References

2013
2013 Ohio elections
Toledo